João Vítor Albano Manuel (born 13 September 1987) is a Swiss footballer. He currently plays as a defender in the Portuguese Second Division for G.D. Lagoa.

Career
Manuel previously played for Liga de Honra side Portimonense. Manuel started his career at the youth level. He enjoyed some success and eventually joined the first team in the 2006/07 season, where he played 10 games. However, since that season, he has had limited chances, making only 3 appearances in that time.

References

1987 births
Living people
Swiss men's footballers
Portimonense S.C. players
Swiss people of Portuguese descent

Association football defenders